Aaron Van Cleave (born 14 March 1987) is a German pair skater. He is best known for his partnership with Mari Vartmann for Germany. They won the 2015 German national title, the 2011 NRW Trophy, and 2010 Warsaw Cup. After they parted ways, he teamed up with Tatiana Domracheva.

Personal life 
Van Cleave was born on 14 March 1987 in Comox, British Columbia, Canada. He was born both a Canadian and American citizen.  He became a German citizen in January 2014.

Career

In North America 
Van Cleave first competed with Lauren Cowley at the Canadian Junior Championships, appearing on the juvenile level in 2002 and pre-novice in 2003. With Sarah McCoy, he represented Canada on the ISU Junior Grand Prix series. They were assigned to Norway in 2006 and the United States in 2007.

Van Cleave then teamed up with Ameena Sheikh where they represented the United States. The team trained in Detroit, Michigan at the Detroit Skating Club under Yuka Sato and Jason Dunjeon.  Van Cleave and Sheikh Competed on the junior level and senior level at the 2009 U.S. Championships and the 2010 U.S. Championships

In Germany 
In 2010, Van Cleave teamed up with Mari Vartmann to compete for Germany. The pair made their international debut at the 2010 Warsaw Cup where they won the gold medal. Their first major international event was the 2012 European Championships. On 26 January, during the morning practice before the long programs, Vartmann collided with Daniel Wende while they were attempting to avoid a French couple. Vartmann and Van Cleave finished 5th at the event. They were coached by Knut Schubert in Berlin.

Vartmann and Van Cleave withdrew from the 2012 Nebelhorn Trophy following the short program – Vartmann picked into her right foot when she fell on a throw triple loop during the short and was unable to put on her skate the next day due to swelling. They withdrew from the 2012 Coupe de Nice and their first assigned Grand Prix event, the 2012 Cup of Russia, after Van Cleave sustained a broken cheekbone while catching Vartmann on a triple twist. They later withdrew from their second GP, the 2012 NHK Trophy.

The pair was coached by Knut Schubert and Stefan Lindemann in Berlin in the first half of the 2014–15 season. In December 2014, they joined Maylin Wende and Daniel Wende in Oberstdorf. They won the pairs title at the 2015 German Championships.

His new partner is Tatiana Domracheva from Russia.

Programs 
(with Vartmann)

Competitive highlights 
GP: Grand Prix; JGP: Junior Grand Prix

With Vartmann

With Sheikh

With McCoy

With Cowley

References

External links

 
 Paarlauf-Fanclub: Mari Vartmann / Aaron Van Cleave

1987 births
Living people
People from Comox, British Columbia
Canadian male pair skaters
American male pair skaters
German male pair skaters
Canadian emigrants to Germany
Naturalized citizens of Germany
Canadian expatriate sportspeople in Germany